Erechtheis was a phyle (tribe) of ancient Athens with fourteen demes.

The phyle was created in the reforms of Kleisthenes. Although there is little specific reference to the tribe, an inscription dated to either 460 or 459BC in the form of a casualty list allows a little access. Two generals are listed for the single year on which the text insists, Ph[ryni]chos is followed in the list by Hippodamas, possibly indicating that he succeeded the former in the summer due to the death of Ph[ryni]chos. Alternatively they were elected together which was not uncommon later. The presence of a seer on the list is surprising, as their role of accompanying the army to interpret omens through the analysis of the entrails of sacrificed animals does not seem particularly dangerous. 

That there is no other tribe mentioned on the inscription is unusual as most casualty lists arrange the dead according to tribe on a single stele or group of joined stelai. This stele, however, appears by the smoothness of the un-inscribed faces of the stone to have been solitary. Despite the use of personal names on the list, the repetitions means that the absence of patronymics prevent the identification of the individual and family referred to in each case. This deprivation of social status could be an example of democratic intentions, but it also does something to lessen the personal impact of the list, perhaps through an attempt to prevent social discord which would have resulted from the realisation of the impact on individual families and communities. 

If the inscription had been divided into the fourteen demes, the exact effect of the losses on individual villages would have been much clearer. Despite the removal of the obvious social status of family associations, names themselves can be used to infer certain things. Greek naming patterns mean that frequently repeated names could indicate family links, and although more social study of Greek names is needed to understand this fully, it is likely that certain names could imply wealth or foreign connections. Examples of this are the names Arcesilas in line 154 of the casualty list, a name common in Sparta at the time, but only later in Athens; and Sicon in line 59 which mainly appear on pots, suggesting a more humble background.

Demes
The demes were Agryle (Upper and Lower), Euonymon, Themakos, Anagyrous, Kedoi, Lamptrai (Upper and Coastal), Pambotadai, Kephisia, Pergase (Upper and Lower), Phegous, Sybridai.

Tribal affiliates
Critias is thought, hypothetically, to have belonged to this phyle.

See also
 Erechtheion

References

Tribes of ancient Attica